Mario Giardini (4 December 1877 – 30 August 1947) was an Italian prelate of the Catholic Church who served in the diplomatic service of the Holy See from 1918 to 1933.

Biography
Mario Giardini was born on 4 December 1877 in Milan. He was ordained a priest on 24 September 1904. He was a member of the Barnabites and early in his career worked as a parish priest and master of novices for his order.

On 21 November 1921, Pope Pius XI named him titular archbishop of Edessa and Apostolic Delegate to Japan. He received his episcopal consecration on 8 December 1921 from Cardinal Andrea Carlo Ferrari. He called a provincial synod to address the question of Catholic participation in Shinto ceremonies and the first Japanese bishop, Januarius Kyunosuke Hayasaka, was appointed in 1926. Both were steps in the local hierarchy gaining its independence from the Paris Foreign Missions Society. Negotiations toward the establishment of diplomatic relations made progress but were blocked by Buddhist opposition in parliament. When his successor, Edward Mooney, was appointed on 30 March 1931, Giardino remained in Japan until Mooney arrived from India and then remained for ten days to share information.

On 16 May 1931, Pope Pius XI appointed him Archbishop of Ancona-Osimo. He retired from this position on 5 February 1940. He continued to work reviewing clergy for the Vicariate of Rome.

He died on 30 August 1947 at the age of 69.

Notes

References

External links 
Catholic Hierarchy: Archbishop Mario Giardini  

1877 births
1947 deaths
Clergy from Milan
Apostolic Nuncios to Japan
Diplomats from Milan
Bishops of Edessa